In computational statistics, the pseudo-marginal Metropolis–Hastings algorithm is a Monte Carlo method to sample from a probability distribution. It is an instance of the popular Metropolis–Hastings algorithm that extends its use to cases where the target density is not available analytically. It relies on the fact that the Metropolis–Hastings algorithm can still sample from the correct target distribution if the target density in the acceptance ratio is replaced by an estimate. It is especially popular in Bayesian statistics, where it is applied if the likelihood function is not tractable (see example below).

Algorithm description 
The aim is to simulate from some probability density function . The algorithm follows the same steps as the standard Metropolis–Hastings algorithm except that the evaluation of the target density is replaced by a non-negative and unbiased estimate. For comparison, the main steps of a Metropolis–Hastings algorithm are outlined below.

Metropolis–Hastings algorithm 

Given a current state  the Metropolis–Hastings algorithm proposes a new state according to some density . The algorithm then sets  with probability

otherwise the old state is kept, that is, .

Pseudo-marginal Metropolis–Hastings algorithm 
If the density  is not available analytically the above algorithm cannot be employed. The pseudo-marginal Metropolis–Hastings algorithm in contrast only assumes the existence of an unbiased estimator  , i.e. the estimator must satisfy the equation  Now, given   and the respective estimate   the algorithm proposes a new state according to some density . Next, compute an estimate   and set  with probability

otherwise the old state is kept, that is, .

Application to Bayesian statistics 
In Bayesian statistics the target of inference is the posterior distribution

Since there is often no analytic expression of this quantity, one often relies on Monte Carlo methods to sample from the distribution instead. Monte Carlo methods often need the likelihood  to be accessible for every parameter value . In some cases, however, the likelihood does not have an analytic expression. An example of such a case is outlined below.

Example: Latent variable model
(This could be due to measurement error, for instance.) We are interested in Bayesian analysis of this model based on some observed data . Therefore, we introduce some prior distribution  on the parameter. In order to compute the posterior distribution

 

we need to find the likelihood function . The likelihood contribution of any observed data point  is then

 

and the joint likelihood of the observed data  is

 

If the integral on the right-hand side is not analytically available, importance sampling can be used to estimate the likelihood. Introduce an auxiliary distribution  such that  for all  then

 

Extensions 
Pseudo-marginal Metropolis-Hastings can be seen as a special case of so-called particle marginal Metropolis-Hastings algorithms. In the case of the latter, unbiased estimators of densities relating to static parameters in state-space models may be obtained using a particle filter. While the algorithm enables inference on both the joint space of static parameters and latent variables, when interest is only in the static parameters the algorithm is equivalent to a pseudo-marginal algorithm.

References 

Monte Carlo methods
Statistical algorithms